Morgan County is a county located in the U.S. state of Indiana. As of the 2010 United States Census, the population was 68,894. The county seat (and only incorporated city) is Martinsville.

Morgan County is between Indianapolis, in Marion County, and Bloomington in Monroe County. It is included in the Indianapolis-Carmel-Anderson, IN Metropolitan Statistical Area. Two major highways, Interstate 69 and Indiana State Road 67, carry large numbers of daily commuters between the two larger communities. The county has 14 townships which provide local services.

History
The future state of Indiana was first regulated by passage of the Northwest Ordinance in 1787. The governing structure created by this act was superposed over an area that was still largely contested with the country's natives, although they were being gradually pushed out of the area. In 1818, a series of treaties was concluded, resulting in the confinement of the Miami tribe to the reserve area and the removal of the Delaware tribe, who had dominated central and east central Indiana, to west of the Mississippi River by 1820, clearing the way for colonization. The area was called the Delaware New Purchase until it was divided into Wabash County in the northwest and Delaware County in the southeast on 2 January 1820. Those counties were soon after dissolved, and the areas came to be called the "Wabash New Purchase" and "Delaware New Purchase" (renamed the "Adams New Purchase" in 1827). Subsequently, 35 new counties (including Morgan, authorized on 15 February 1822) were carved out of the original area. It was named for Gen. Daniel Morgan, who defeated the British at the Battle of Cowpens in the Revolutionary War.

The first settlers arrived in Morgan County in 1822. They came mostly from southern states. The Mooresville area and surrounding communities received large numbers of southern Quakers, driven to migrate because of their opposition to slavery. Paul Hadley, a Mooresville resident, was the designer of the current Indiana flag, as well as a locally prominent water color artist in the early twentieth century.

In the late nineteenth and early twentieth centuries, mineral springs in Martinsville gave rise to several spas, and the nickname of the Martinsville High School athletic teams has subsequently been the Artesians.

County government took several steps forward in the 2000s, creating a new Plan Commission, re-instituting a county economic development organization, and establishing the county's first Park and Recreation Board between 2000 and 2004. Morgan County also was the first county in the metropolitan Indianapolis region to establish a smoking ban ordinance for restaurants, taking that step in 2004. Other communities in the region soon followed Morgan County's lead.

Courthouse
The first building used for Morgan County courts was the log house of a pioneer. Work began in 1823 to build the first courthouse, a two-story log house. A brick courthouse replaced it in 1833.

The Morgan County courthouse was designed by Isaac Hodgson in the Italianate style. It was built from 1857 to 1859 by Perry M. Blankenship of Martinsville at a cost of $32,000. It was almost identical to Hodgson's Jennings County courthouse in Vernon, which was also begun in 1857, but the Martinsville building received an addition in the 1970s; the original section was also remodeled and renovated at that time. The building is of red brick with white stone quoins and has tall windows with round arches, arranged in pairs. It is one of the few remaining pre-Civil War courthouses.

Geography
Morgan County is where the glaciers stopped their southward advance during the last ice age. As a result, the area has both flat areas and rolling hills, with the most diverse soil of any county in the United States. The extensive woodlands of the eighteenth century have been cleared on the county's flat areas, with agricultural or urban uses dominating. The county is significantly carved with wooded drainages, leading to the southwest-flowing White River.

Morgan County is bisected by the White River Valley; the community has taken an interest in recent years in protecting the river as an asset, seeking to develop parks and greenways along the White River and initiating an annual river cleanup day in the spring.

The county also is home to large areas of land that were not glaciated during the last ice age. The river valley and contributing watersheds, along with the non-glaciated hills, results in a topography unlike the rest of the metropolitan Indianapolis area. County residents are proud of the scenic terrain, and in recent years have established a county park system and a bike/pedestrian trail system plan to provide protection and access to the amenities. An annual  run is held as a fundraiser for the path system endowment.

Adjacent counties

 Hendricks County (north)
 Marion County (northeast)
 Johnson County (east)
 Brown County (southeast)
 Monroe County (south)
 Owen County (southwest)
 Putnam County (northwest)

Major highways

  Interstate 69
  Interstate 70
  State Road 37
  State Road 39
  State Road 42
  State Road 44
  State Road 67
  State Road 135
  State Road 142
  State Road 144
  State Road 252
  State Road 267

Communities

City and towns

 Bethany
 Brooklyn
 Martinsville (city/county seat)
 Monrovia
 Mooresville
 Morgantown
 Paragon

Unincorporated places

 Adams
 Alaska
 Allman
 Banta
 Beech Grove
 Bluffs
 Briarwood
 Brookmoor
 Bunker Hill
 Camby (part)
 Center Valley
 Centerton
 Champlin Meadows
 Chetwynd
 Cope
 Crestview Heights
 Crown Center
 Eminence
 Exchange
 Fields
 Five Points
 Gasburg
 Hall
 Hyndsdale
 Lake Hart
 Landersdale
 Lewisville
 Little Point
 Mahalasville
 Maxwell
 McDaniel
 Miller
 Mount Zion Corner
 Painted Hills (census-designated place)
 Plano
 Ridgewood
 Shelburne
 Stines Mill Corner
 Taggart Crossing
 Turkey Track
 Wakeland
 Waverly
 Waverly Woods
 Whitaker
 Wilbur
 Willowbrook Estates
 Wiser
 Woodcrest
 Wolff
 Young

Townships

 Adams
 Ashland
 Baker
 Brown
 Clay
 Green
 Gregg
 Harrison
 Jackson
 Jefferson
 Madison
 Monroe
 Ray
 Washington

Climate and weather

Government

The county government is a constitutional body granted specific powers by the Constitution of Indiana and the Indiana Code. The county council is the fiscal branch of the county government and controls spending and revenue collection. Four Council members are elected from county districts, and three are elected at-large by the entire county electorate. The council members serve four-year terms and are responsible for setting salaries, the annual budget and special spending. The council has limited authority to impose local taxes, in the form of optional income taxes and the property tax levy that is subject to state level approval, excise taxes and service taxes.

The executive body of the county; commissioners are elected county-wide to staggered four-year terms. One commissioner serves as president. The commissioners execute acts legislated by the council, collect revenue and manage the county government.

The county maintains a small claims court that handles civil cases. The judge on the court is elected to a term of four years and must be a member of the Indiana Bar Association. The judge is assisted by a constable who is elected to a four-year term. In some cases, court decisions can be appealed to the state level circuit court.

The county has other elected offices, including sheriff, coroner, auditor, treasurer, recorder, surveyor and circuit court clerk. These officers are elected to four-year terms. Members elected to county government positions are required to declare party affiliations and be residents of the county.

Each township has a trustee who administers rural fire protection and ambulance service, provides poor relief and manages cemetery care, among other duties. The trustee is assisted in these duties by a three-member township board. The trustees and board members are elected to four-year terms.

Morgan County is split between Indiana's fourth and ninth districts; Indiana Senate districts 35 and 37; and Indiana House of Representatives districts 47 and 91.

Demographics

2010 Census
As of the 2010 United States Census, there were 68,894 people, 25,765 households, and 19,355 families in the county. The racial makeup of the county was 97.7% white, 0.4% Asian, 0.3% American Indian, 0.3% black or African American, 0.3% from other races, and 1.0% from two or more races. Those of Hispanic or Latino origin made up 1.2% of the population. In terms of ancestry, 46% of people in Morgan County were of English ancestry, 22.1% were of German ancestry, and 10.3% were of Irish ancestry.
Of the 25,765 households, 35.8% had children under the age of 18 living with them, 59.8% were married couples living together, 10.1% had a female householder with no husband present, 24.9% were non-families, and 20.3% of all households were made up of individuals. The average household size was 2.65 and the average family size was 3.04. The median age was 39.9 years.

The median income for a household in the county was $47,697 and the median income for a family was $62,507. Males had a median income of $48,457 versus $34,831 for females. The per capita income for the county was $23,972. About 7.2% of families and 10.1% of the population were below the poverty line, including 14.9% of those under age 18 and 6.8% of those age 65 or over.

Education
Morgan County is served by the Morgan County Public Library, which operates six branches.

See also
 National Register of Historic Places listings in Morgan County, Indiana

References

External links
 County website

 
Indiana counties
1822 establishments in Indiana
Populated places established in 1822
Indianapolis metropolitan area